Zero Hours Justice is a non party political campaign that aims at regulating fair working practises in the UK, concentrating on eradicating Zero-Hour Contracts. This campaign is backed by the Trade Union Congress (TUC).The organisation was recognised and supported by an Early Day Motion in Parliament.

History

Zero Hours Justice was created by a coalition of citizens concerned about the effect of zero-hour contracts on financial and emotional wellbeing, especially during the outbreak of the worldwide Covid pandemic. This campaign was founded by Julian Richer in 2020. Julian is the author of The Ethical Capitalist.

The campaign President is Ian Hodson, who is also President of the Bakers, Food and Allied Workers Union.

Zero Hours Justice was launched with the aim of ending zero-hours contracts, where unilaterally imposed on a worker against their will. In due course, several prolific people joined this cause such as Peter Stefanovic, Declan Owens, Damien Morrison and Pravin Jeyaraj. In 2021, Chris Peace joined as Campaign Director.

Zero Hours Justice focuses on campaigning against the use of zero hours contracts. In 2022 they launched their free Accreditation Scheme to promote employers who don't use zero hours contracts, or, if they do, only use them in accordance with the campaign's minimum criteria.

This campaign also offers free help and support to the people affected by zero-hour contracts, providing legal information and advice through a telephone helpline, email and website. The campaign also empowers people by circulating necessary information regarding zero hour contracts and promoting healthy working environments.

Media Coverage

Zero Hours Justice has worked with a number of media outlets to promote its campaign and raise awareness of the plight of zero hours workers, including: Channel 4's Dispatches (TV programme), Good Housekeeping, and Daily Record (Scotland).

Zero Hours Justice collaborated with Rest Lass, a digital community for the over-50s, for an article published in The Guardian,

External links
Zero Hours Justice

References

Political campaigns